Vacher is a surname of French origin. Its literal translation means a keeper of stock or cattle or a herdsman but is generally used by people whose ancestry is traced to the cow-herders. It is also used by a small group of people in India. People with the name include:

Antoine Vacher (1873–1920), French geographer
Charles Vacher, (1818–1883), watercolour painter
Chris Vacher (born 1951), British television news presenter
Georges Vacher de Lapouge (1854–1936), French anthropologist and theoretician of eugenics and racialism
Joseph Vacher (1869–1898), French serial killer
Laurent-Michel Vacher (1944–2005), French Canadian philosopher, writer, and journalist
Paul Vacher (before 1936–1975), French perfumer
Polly Vacher (born 1944), English aviator
Sydney Vacher (fl. 1886–1890), English architect
Thomas Brittain Vacher (1805–1880), English lithographer, legal stationer, and printer
William Herbert Vacher (1826–1899), British merchant and banker

References